The Rama Dam is a concrete-face rock-fill dam on the Rama river, a tributary of the Neretva river, about  southwest of the town of Prozor in the Herzegovina-Neretva Canton of Bosnia and Herzegovina. 

Dam and its hydropower plant are operated by Elektroprivreda HZ HB, public power utility company in Bosnia and Herzegovina owned by Federation of Bosnia and Herzegovina entity government.

Characteristics
The dam was constructed between 1964 and 1968 with the primary purpose of hydroelectric power production. It contains two 80 MW Francis turbine-generators for an installed capacity of 160 MW.

History
The power station ceased operations between 1993 and 1996 due to the Bosnian War.

References

External links
Hydroelectric power plant Rama construction, documentary film by Hajrudin Krvavac (YouTube)
Rama valley before flooding, documentary film TVSA (YouTube)
Rama valley before and after flooding, reportage by Hayat TV (YouTube)

Dams in Bosnia and Herzegovina
Concrete-face rock-fill dams
Dams completed in 1968
Prozor-Rama
Hydroelectric power stations in Bosnia and Herzegovina
Energy infrastructure completed in 1968
1968 establishments in Bosnia and Herzegovina
Underground hydroelectric power stations in Bosnia and Herzegovina